Hasher bin Maktoum bin Butti Al Maktoum acceded to become the Ruler of Dubai in 1859, following the unexpected death by natural causes of his uncle, Sheikh Saeed bin Butti.

Rule 
Still young at the time of his accession, Hasher ruled over a period of economic prosperity and growth for Dubai. The maritime truce made with the British created an environment where coastal trade could flourish. The diversity of that trade included a lively market for slaves from Africa and elsewhere, and the British, contrary to their original intentions in establishing treaty relations with the Trucial Rulers, found themselves becoming more involved with the activities of the coastal communities. In 1847, they promulgated a treaty for the suppression of the slave trade, which was signed by Hasher and the other Trucial Rulers in 1856.

Under Hasher's rule, the disparate economies of the districts around the core settlement of Dubai were brought together, particularly those of Bur Dubai, Deira, Hamriyah and Jumeirah, into a single community—although the settlements of Deira and Bur Dubai, on either side of the Dubai Creek, had their own head men.

Treaty and conflict 
In 1864, Hasher and the other Trucial Rulers were signatory to the 'Additional Article to the Maritime Truce Providing for the Protection of the Telegraph Line and Stations, Dated 1864'. An agreement regarding the treatment of absconding debtors followed in June 1879.

Despite the growth of Dubai as a trading port, relationships with the tribes of the interior and other coastal Rulers were not always cordial. Lorimer notes in 1875 an expedition from Dubai of 200 men to Ras Al Khaimah, where 7 were killed in fighting, followed by skirmishes along the coast which culminated in a force from Abu Dhabi and Dubai 'ravaging the gardens of Fasht and Sharjah'. Fasht is the modern day Sharjah suburb of Al Fisht, contiguous with Al Heera. This conflict was followed by a year of peace, until in 1877 further fighting broke out with the tribes of the interior and in 1877 through 1878, numerous raids were carried out by the Daru', Bani Kitab and 'Awamir. Tired of the conflict, a peace was arranged between the tribes and townsmen. By this time, according to Lorimer, Dubai had become 'the principal port on the coast'. By 1882, Sheikh Hasher was at peace and had established good relations with both Sharjah and Abu Dhabi.

It was likely during Hasher's reign that the mountain village of Hajarain, today known as Hatta, became part of Dubai after the Omani Sultan Turki bin Said, transferred the territory after finding himself unable to defend it against the Na'im of Buraimi, who had settled neighbouring Masfout (today a part of the emirate of Ajman). Hasher backed Turki against the Imam Azzan bin Qais at the 1870 Battle of Dhank, which established Turki's primacy over Oman. 

In relating an account of three British subjects (two Persians and an Indian) who made claims against Hasher's subjects in 1878, Lorimer characterised Hasher as being 'A man of quick and impetuous temper even for an Arab.'

He died in 1886.

See also 
 Al Maktoum

References 

Maktoum family
Rulers of Dubai
19th-century Arabs